John Henry Hughes (25 September 1912 – 1991) was an English professional footballer who played as an outside right. He made over 250 total appearances in the English Football League playing for Wrexham, Bolton Wanderers, Chester, Chesterfield and Bradford Park Avenue.

References

1912 births
1991 deaths
English footballers
Association football midfielders
English Football League players
Wrexham A.F.C. players
Bolton Wanderers F.C. players
Chester City F.C. players
Chesterfield F.C. players
Bradford (Park Avenue) A.F.C. players
Oswestry Town F.C. players